The 2018–19 season was Celtic's 130th season of competitive football. They competed in the Scottish Premiership, League Cup, Scottish Cup, UEFA Champions League and UEFA Europa League. Celtic won all three domestic tournaments, completing an unprecedented treble treble.

Pre-season and friendlies
Celtic preceded the 2018–19 campaign with a pre-season tour of Austria, with matches against SK Vorwärts Steyr, Bohemians 1905, Blau-Weiß Linz and Sparta Prague. They also faced Shamrock Rovers and Standard Liège.

Scottish Premiership

The Scottish Premiership fixture list was announced on 15 June 2018. Celtic began their title defence against newly-promoted Livingston at Celtic Park.

Scottish League Cup

On 29 July, Celtic were drawn to face Partick Thistle at Firhill Stadium in the second round of the 2018–19 Scottish League Cup. The League Cup holders progressed to the quarter-finals with a 3–1 victory over their city rivals. On 19 August, Celtic were drawn to face St Johnstone at McDiarmid Park in the quarter-finals. The Bhoys' trophy defence continued courtesy of a late Leigh Griffiths strike in Perth. On 26 September, Celtic were drawn to face Heart of Midlothian in the semi-finals. Goals from Scott Sinclair, James Forrest and Ryan Christie secured Celtic's place in the final, a third consecutive League Cup final and fifth consecutive domestic cup final in Brendan Rodgers' reign. On 2 December, Celtic won the Scottish League Cup for the third consecutive season, defeating Aberdeen 1–0 in the final.

Scottish Cup

On 24 November, Celtic were drawn to face Airdrieonians at Celtic Park in the fourth round of the 2018–19 Scottish Cup. A Scott Sinclair double and a debut goal for Timothy Weah secured a 3–0 win. On 20 January 2019, Celtic were drawn to face St Johnstone in the fifth round. Scott Sinclair's hat-trick was coupled by Scott Brown's first goal in two years, and a James Forrest strike, which sealed Celtic's place in the quarter-finals. On 11 February, Celtic were drawn to face Hibernian at Easter Road in the quarter-finals. Goals from James Forrest and Scott Brown secured Celtic's place in the semi-finals. On 4 March, Celtic were drawn to face Aberdeen or Rangers in the semi-finals. On 12 March, it was determined that Aberdeen would be Celtic's opponents, having defeated Rangers 2–0 in their quarter-final replay. The Bhoys sealed their place in the final with James Forrest, Odsonne Édouard and Tom Rogic all on the scoresheet.

UEFA Champions League

Celtic entered the Champions League at the first qualifying round.

First qualifying round
On 19 June, Celtic were drawn to face Alashkert (Armenia) in the first qualifying round of the UEFA Champions League. The Bhoys won 3–0 in both legs – courtesy of goals from Odsonne Édouard, James Forrest, Callum McGregor and Moussa Dembélé – and secured a place in the next round.

Second qualifying round
On 18 July, it was determined that Celtic would face Rosenborg (Norway) in the second qualifying round of the UEFA Champions League. The Scottish champions eliminated the Norwegian side in the previous season's qualifying phase and did so again. Goals from Odsonne Édouard and Olivier Ntcham secured Celtic's passage into the next round.

Third qualifying round
On 1 August, it was determined that Celtic would face AEK Athens (Greece) in the third qualifying round of the UEFA Champions League. The Bhoys were eliminated following a 3–2 defeat on aggregate and parachuted into the UEFA Europa League play-off round.

UEFA Europa League

Play-Off round
On 16 August, it was determined that Celtic would face Sūduva (Lithuania) in the Play-Off Round of the UEFA Europa League. The Bhoys last faced the Lithuanian side in the 2002–03 UEFA Cup first round; a 10–1 aggregate victory marked the beginning of Celtic's path to the final in Seville.

Group stage
On 30 August, the draw for the 2018–19 UEFA Europa League Group Stage was made. Celtic were drawn in Group B along with Red Bull Salzburg (Pot 1), RB Leipzig (Pot 3) and Rosenborg (Pot 4).

Group B

Matches

Round of 32
On 17 December, Celtic were drawn to face Valencia in the 2018–19 UEFA Europa League Round of 32.

Statistics

Appearances and goals

|-
! colspan=16 style=background:#dcdcdc; text-align:center| Goalkeepers
|-

|-
! colspan=16 style=background:#dcdcdc; text-align:center| Defenders
|-

|-
! colspan=16 style=background:#dcdcdc; text-align:center| Midfielders
|-

|-
! colspan=16 style=background:#dcdcdc; text-align:center| Forwards
|-

|-
! colspan=16 style=background:#dcdcdc; text-align:center| Departures
|-

|}

Notes

Goalscorers

Last updated: 25 May 2019

Disciplinary record
Includes all competitive matches. Players listed below made at least one appearance for Celtic first squad during the season.

Hat-tricks

4  Player scored four goals; (H) – Home; (A) – Away; (N) – Neutral

Clean sheets
As of 25 May 2019.

Attendances

Team statistics

League table

Competition Overview

Results by round

Club

Technical Staff

Kit
Supplier: New Balance / Sponsors: Dafabet (front) and Magners (back)

The club is in the fourth year of a deal with manufacturer New Balance. The kit range for the 2018–19 season is inspired by the Bold Bhoys and marks 115 years since the club first used green and white hoops on the jersey.

Home: The home kit features a bespoke tonal tartan design throughout the traditional green and white hoops. White shorts and hooped socks complete the look.
Away: The away kit also features a tartan design set against White and Eden Green. The shirt is accompanied by Eden Green shorts and hooped socks.
Third: The third kit features a bold black and yellow design and is inspired by the club's famous bumble-bee kits of the past. Black shorts and hooped socks complete the look.

Transfers

In

Out

See also
Nine in a row
 List of Celtic F.C. seasons

References

Celtic F.C. seasons
Celtic
Celtic
Celtic
Scottish football championship-winning seasons